Eric Walther (born 13 March 1975 in East Berlin) is a three-time Olympic modern pentathlete from Germany. He is a two-time world champion for the relay events, and also, won an individual gold medal at the 2003 World Modern Pentathlon Championships in Pesaro, Italy.

Walther had achieved his best result in an Olympic level, when he competed at the 2004 Summer Olympics in Athens, and finished seventh for the men's event, with a score of 5,320 points.

References

External links
 

1975 births
Living people
German male modern pentathletes
Olympic modern pentathletes of Germany
Modern pentathletes at the 2000 Summer Olympics
Modern pentathletes at the 2004 Summer Olympics
Modern pentathletes at the 2008 Summer Olympics
World Modern Pentathlon Championships medalists
Sportspeople from Berlin